Nukabad-e Sarhang (also Romanized as Nūkābād-e Sarhang; also known as Nook Abad, Nowkābād, and Nūkābād) is a village in Howmeh Rural District, in the Central District of Iranshahr County, Sistan and Baluchestan Province, Iran. At the 2006 census, its population was 2,704, in 567 families.

References 

Populated places in Iranshahr County